Padaingdaw, also spelled Pan Taing Taw or Pa Daing Taw (pronunciation ) is a village of Myaing Township in Magway Region of central  Myanmar.

Religious Places
 Weizza Gon Yee Monastery- 
 Mattahtaung Pagoda -
 Dhamma Vihara Sasana Vimana Monastery -  
 Thanbo Zeti
 Taw Zeedaw Monastery

Education 
B.E.H.S (sub) Padaingdaw -

External links
 - Myanmar Information Management Unit 2015

References 

Township capitals of Myanmar
Populated places in Magway Region